Sir Bear (foaled 1993 in Florida) is a retired American Thoroughbred racehorse who got better as he grew older and raced successfully until retiring at age ten.

He was bred by Florida veterinarian, Dr. Al Smollin, and raced by his wife, Barbara. He was trained by Jamaica native Ralph Ziadie from a base at Calder Race Course in Miami Gardens.

Sir Bear raced in Florida and also competed at racetracks from Ohio to the East Coast of the United States. A multiple Grade I winner, his victories include the 1998 Cigar Mile Handicap and the 1999 Metropolitan Handicap. In 2002, at age nine, he won his third Skip Away Handicap by defeating Preakness Stakes winner, Red Bullet.

Sir Bear made his last start at age ten on January 25, 2003, in the Sunshine Millions Classic at Gulfstream Park.

References

 Sir Bear's pedigree and partial racing stats
 March 10, 2001 Thoroughbred times article titled "The Old Man" can still run

1993 racehorse births
Thoroughbred family 1-n
Racehorses bred in Florida
Racehorses trained in the United States